The 1978 Meghalaya Legislative Assembly election was held on 25 February 1978. No party secured a majority of seats in the election.  Following negotiations, a coalition government, known as the Meghalaya United Legislative Party, was formed between the All Party Hill Leaders Conference, the Hill State People's Democratic Party and the Public Demands Implementation Convention (PDIC). Due to an inability to reach agreement between the coalition parties, the position of Chief Minister was chosen by drawing lots; subsequently, on 10 March 1978, Darwin Diengdoh Pugh was sworn in as the state's second Chief Minister. Miriam D Shira from Garo Hills was the only woman elected to the legislature.

Results 

 The HSPDP won 8 seats in the 1972 election, but the party's representatives were recorded as independents at the time of that election.

Two candidates from the PDIC were elected, but the party had not obtained registration in time for the election; the party's representatives were recorded as independents in the official results.

Elected Members

References 

Meghalaya
State Assembly elections in Meghalaya
1970s in Meghalaya